Mary Elizabeth Atkins (born in London) was an English painter of landscape, interiors and flowers.

Atkins studied at the Slade School and exhibited at the Royal Academy and the New English Art Club.

Her painting of the village of Chalford is in the collection of Leeds Art Gallery since 1927.

References

English women painters
20th-century English painters
19th-century English painters
Year of birth unknown
Year of death unknown
19th-century English women artists
20th-century English women artists